Festimad is an alternative rock festival and cultural event held yearly in Madrid, Spain since 1994, usually in the last week of May. Festimad includes several parallel cultural festivals such as Performa, Graffiti, Universimad o Cinemad, although its central event continues to be the music festival, standing alongside the Festival Internacional de Benicàssim as Spain's main rock concert.

External links 

 Official Festimad website.
 Spanish Wikipedia featured article.

Rock festivals in Spain
Music festivals in Spain
Festivals in Madrid
Móstoles
Recurring events established in 1994